Field hockey was contested for men only at the 1978 Asian Games in Bangkok, Thailand.

Medalists

Results

Preliminary round

Group A

Group B

Consolation round

Semifinals

7th place match

5th place match

Final round

Semifinals

Bronze medal match

Final

References

External links
 

 
1978 Asian Games events
1978
Asian Games
1978 Asian Games